Baktykozha Salakhidenuly Izmukhambetov (Baqtyqoja Salahidenūly Izmūhambetov; born 1 September 1948) is a Kazakh politician who served as the Chair of the Mazhilis from March to June 2016, äkim of Atyrau Region from 2012 to 2016, äkim of West Kazakhstan Region from 2007 to 2012, and a Minister of Energy and Mineral Resources from 2006 to 2007.

Career
From 1966 to 1971, Izmukhambetov studied at the Ufa State Petroleum Technological University. After graduating, he started as a driller with Embaneft association and later occupied a number of positions in Kazakh Exploration R&D Institute. From 1983 to 1987, Izmukhambetov was in mission in Yemen.

Between 1991 and 1993, Izmukhambetov held different posts at the Ministry of Geology and Subsurface Protection. After that, he served as the director-general of Kazakhturkmunay and Kazmunaytengiz oil companies, and as a managing director of the national oil company KazMunayGas. Later, he served as the first vice minister of Energy and Mineral Resources, and from 19 January 2006 until 28 August 2007 as a minister of Energy and Mineral Resources.

He served as Akim of the West Kazakhstan Region from 28 August 2007 to January 2012 and as Minister of Energy and Mineral Resources of Kazakhstan from 2006 to 2007.

During the 2012 legislative election, Izmukhambetov was elected to the Mazhilis, he was subsequently appointed as the Deputy Chair. From 2012 to 2016 he served as Akim of the Atyrau Region, he succeeded Bergey Ryskaliyev in this position. He was himself succeeded by Nurlan Nogaev on 26 March 2016. On 25 March 2016, Izmukhambetov was sworn in as the Chair of the Mazhilis and succeeded Kabibulla Dzhakupov. On 21 June 2016, Izmukhambetov resigned as the Mazhilis Chair to become chairman of the Republican Public Association of Veterans Organization of the Central Council. He was succeeded as chair by Nurlan Nigmatulin.

Izmukhambetov is decorated with the Order of Kurmet (1999) and with the third class of the Order of Merit of Ukraine (2008).

References

1948 births
Living people
Chairmen of the Mazhilis
Members of the Mazhilis
Ministers of Energy (Kazakhstan)
Nur Otan politicians
Recipients of the Order of Kurmet